Joseph Andrew Paterson (born June 25, 1960) is a Canadian former professional ice hockey left winger who played nine seasons in the National Hockey League (NHL).

Career 
During his career in the NHL, Paterson played for the Detroit Red Wings, Philadelphia Flyers, Los Angeles Kings and New York Rangers between 1980 and 1989. He later served as the head coach of the Sault Ste. Marie Greyhounds of the Ontario Hockey League, the Louisville Panthers of the American Hockey League (AHL), and the Adirondack Phantoms of the AHL. He was a pro scout with the Kings from 2013 to 2015.

Career statistics

Regular season and playoffs

References

External links
 

1960 births
Living people
Adirondack Red Wings players
Atlanta Thrashers
Binghamton Rangers players
Canadian ice hockey coaches
Canadian ice hockey left wingers
Denver Rangers players
Detroit Red Wings draft picks
Detroit Red Wings players
Flint Spirits players
Hershey Bears players
Kalamazoo Wings (1974–2000) players
London Knights players
Los Angeles Kings players
Los Angeles Kings scouts
New Haven Nighthawks players
New York Rangers players
Philadelphia Flyers players
Philadelphia Flyers scouts
Phoenix Roadrunners (IHL) players
Sault Ste. Marie Greyhounds coaches
Ice hockey people from Toronto